Guillaume Cliche-Rivard is a Canadian politician, who was elected to the National Assembly of Quebec in the 2023 Saint-Henri—Sainte-Anne provincial by-election.

Political career 
Cliche-Rivard unsuccessfully contested Saint-Henri–Sainte-Anne in the 2022 Quebec general election. Leader of the Quebec Liberal Party Dominique Anglade resigned following the election, and Cliche-Rivard was elected in the by-election that followed.

Electoral record

2023 Saint-Henri—Sainte-Anne provincial by-election

2022 election

References 

Living people
Year of birth missing (living people)
Place of birth missing (living people)
21st-century Canadian politicians
Québec solidaire MNAs
Politicians from Montreal